General elections were held in India on 16, 22 and 28 February 1998 to elect the members of the 12th Lok Sabha. The elections were held three years ahead of schedule after the government led by Inder Kumar Gujral collapsed when the Indian National Congress (INC) withdrew its support in November 1997.

The result was another hung parliament, with no party or alliance able to muster a majority. However, Atal Bihari Vajpayee of the Bharatiya Janata Party was able to form a coalition government led by the National Democratic Alliance with the support of the Telugu Desam Party. He was sworn in as Prime Minister with support from 272 of 543 MPs. However, his government collapsed on 17 April 1999 when the All India Anna Dravida Munnetra Kazhagam withdrew their support. This led to fresh elections in 1999.

Results

By state

See also
Election Commission of India

References

 
1998 elections in India
February 1998 events in Asia
India
General elections in India